Michael Paul Ford (born 9 February 1966) is an English football manager and former professional player. His father, Tony Ford, was also a professional footballer.

Playing career
Ford began his career at Leicester City where he became a full-time professional at the age of 18. He was released by the club without making an appearance and moved to non-league side Devizes Town but he was signed a few months later by Cardiff City and quickly made his debut in a 1–1 draw with Leeds United. A mainstay in the side, Ford played in numerous positions for Cardiff in defence and midfield and helped them to promotion in his final year at the club. He signed for Oxford United in 1988 and was eventually made club captain. He spent ten years at the Manor Ground before being released in 1998 and being taken back to Ninian Park by Frank Burrows, who handed him the captaincy; he again helped Cardiff to promotion.

Managerial career
During the 1999–2000 season he developed a problem with a disc in his back and was forced to retire. After his retirement he was appointed as youth team manager at Oxford and was called back into action for the team in 2000 when the team faced an injury crisis, making one appearance against Bristol City. Ford also took over as caretaker manager on two separate occasions for Oxford when they were between managers and was working as assistant manager at the club when he was fired in 2003, a decision that caused outrage among Oxford fans. After he was sacked Ford had a spell playing for non-league side Thame United.

Ford was the manager of Conference North football team Oxford City, who gained promotion in the 2011–12 season. He was also working as a football coach at the North Oxfordshire Academy teaching football skills and theory to 16- to 21-year-olds at the Academy sixth form, but is now employed by Oxford and Cherwell Valley College coaching students in the 16–19 age bracket. His team produced 3 or 4 players who helped the Oxford City first team to promotion.

On 30 April 2014, Oxford City announced that Ford would no longer be their first-team manager. After a year out of the game, in May 2015 he was appointed manager of Banbury United in the Southern League Division 1 South & West. He earned promotion to the Southern Premier Division in his first season as manager via the playoffs.

On 29 April 2020, Banbury United announced that Ford would cease to manage the club once his contract expired at the end of the month.

References

External links

1966 births
Living people
Footballers from Bristol
English footballers
Association football defenders
Leicester City F.C. players
Devizes Town F.C. players
Cardiff City F.C. players
Oxford United F.C. players
Thame United F.C. players
English Football League players
National League (English football) players
English football managers
Oxford United F.C. managers
Oxford City F.C. managers
Oxford United F.C. non-playing staff
Banbury United F.C. managers
English Football League managers
National League (English football) managers
Southern Football League managers